The GX4000 is a video game console that was manufactured by Amstrad. It was the company's short-lived attempt to enter the games console market. The console was released in Europe in 1990 and was an upgraded design based on the then still-popular CPC technology. The GX4000 shared hardware architecture with Amstrad's CPC Plus computer line, which was released concurrently. This allowed the system to be compatible with the majority of CPC Plus software.

The GX4000 was Amstrad's first and only attempt at entering the console market. Although offering enhanced graphics capabilities, it failed to gain popularity in the market, and was quickly discontinued, selling 15,000 units in total.

Launch

After months of speculation, the GX4000 was officially announced along with the 464 plus and 6128 plus computers at the CNIT Centre in Paris in August 1990. The system was launched a month later in four countries, Britain, France, Spain, and Italy, priced at £99.99 in Britain and 990F in France; software was priced at £25 for most games. The racing game Burnin' Rubber, a power pack, and two controllers were bundled with the machine.

Initial reviews of the console were favourable, with CVG calling it a "neat looking and technically impressive console that has an awful lot of potential at the very low price of £99", but while impressed by the graphical capabilities, they criticised the audio and controllers. ACE magazine came to a similar conclusion, stating that the system "puts the other 8-bit offerings to shame bar the PC-Engine".

A marketing budget of £20 million was set aside for Europe, with the advertising focused on selling the GX4000 as a home alternative to playing arcade games. The tagline for the machine was "Bring the whole arcade into your home!"

Market performance

The GX4000 was not successful commercially. During its lifespan, software for the system was short in number and slow to arrive, consumer interest was low, and coverage from popular magazines of the time was slight, with some readers complaining about a lack of information regarding the machine (Amstrad Action was one of the few magazines to support the console). Within a few weeks of the initial launch, the system could be bought at discounted prices, and by July 1991 some stores were selling it for as little as £29.99.

Many GX4000 games were CPC games repackaged on cartridge with minor or no improvements, which lead to consumer disinterest, with many users unwilling to pay £25 for a cartridge game they could buy for £3.99 on cassette instead.

Amstrad lacked the marketing power to compete with the producers of the Mega Drive (released in November 1990 in Europe) and eventually the Super NES. There were also problems with software manufacturing, with companies complaining that the duplication process took months instead of weeks, leading to little software available at launch, and some games being released late or cancelled entirely. 

When discussing the market failure of the system, the designer, Cliff Lawson, claimed that the GX4000 was technically "at least as good" as the SNES, and that the machine faltered due to a lack of games and Amstrad not having the money to compete with Nintendo and Sega. When asked whether anything could have been done to make the machine a success, he replied that more money would have been required to give software houses more incentive to support Amstrad, and that the games and software needed to be delivered sooner; he also remarked that making the machine 16-bit would have helped.

Technical specifications

CPU: 8/16-bit Zilog Z80A at 4 MHz
ASIC: Support for sprites, soft scrolling, programmable interrupts, DMA Sound

Resolution

Mode 0: 160x200 pixels with 16 colours
Mode 1: 320x200 pixels with 4 colours
Mode 2: 640x200 pixels with 2 colours

Colour

Depth: 12-bit RGB
Colours available: 4096
Maximum colours onscreen: 32 (16 for background, 15 for sprites, 1 for border)

Maximum onscreen colour counts can be increased in all Modes through the use of interrupts.

Sprites 

Number: 16 high resolution sprites per line
Sizes: 16x16 (each sprite can be magnified 2x or 4x in X and Y)
Colours: Each sprite can use up to 15 colours

Memory 

RAM: 64 kB
VRam: 16 kB
ROM: 32 kB

Audio

3-channel stereo; AY-3-8912 chip
DMA

IO

Audio output, 2x Digital controller connectors, Analog controller port (IBM standard), Lightgun connector (RJ11), Audio and RGB Video output (8-pin DIN), Power supply socket from external PSU, Power supply socket from monitor.

Peripherals

Standard controllers

The GX4000 controller is similar to popular 8-bit gamepads of the time such as those for the Master System and Nintendo Entertainment System, as well as that for the TurboGrafx-16. It contains only two buttons on the actual pad with the pause button located on the console itself, and uses the prevailing de facto standard Atari-style 9-pin connector.

Analog Joysticks

The GX4000 supports the use of analog controllers through its specific IBM standard analog controller port. The controller was not widely supported by software.

Lightguns

The GX4000 supports the use of a lightgun through its dedicated RJ11 lightgun connector. Multiple 3rd party Lightguns were available, and official releases supported this peripheral. There were two games supporting the use of a lightgun on the GX4000 — Skeet Shoot and The Enforcer, both of which were distributed with a third-party gun.

Games
In all, nearly 30 games were produced and distributed for the GX4000. The majority of games were made by UK- and French-based companies such as Ocean, Titus, and Loriciels.

Notable games were the pack-in game, Burnin' Rubber, as well as RoboCop 2, Pang, Plotting, Navy Seals and Switchblade.

Many more games were initially announced, such as Toki, Kick Off 2, and Out Run, but later cancelled when the system failed to sell.

Barbarian II: The Dungeon of Drax
Batman
Burnin' Rubber
Copter 271
Crazy Cars II
Dick Tracy
Fire & Forget II
Klax
Mystical
Navy SEALS
No Exit
Operation Thunderbolt
Pang
Panza Kick Boxing 
Super Pinball Magic
Plotting
Pro Tennis Tour
RoboCop 2
Skeet Shoot
Special Criminal Investigation
Switchblade
Tennis Cup 2
Tintin on the Moon
Trojan Light Panzer
The Enforcer
Wild Streets
World of Sports

References

External links

Old-Computers.com page on the GX 4000
The CPCwiki article about the GX4000. Much info

Home video game consoles
Third-generation video game consoles
Amstrad CPC
Amstrad
Products introduced in 1990
Z80-based video game consoles